This is a list of 120 species in Diacyclops, a genus of cyclopoid copepods in the family Cyclopidae.

Diacyclops species

 Diacyclops abyssicola (Lilljeborg, 1901) c g
 Diacyclops alabamensis J. W. Reid, 1992 i c g
 Diacyclops albus J. W. Reid, 1992 i c g
 Diacyclops alticola (Kiefer, 1935) c g
 Diacyclops andinus Locascio de Mitrovich & Menu-Marque, 2001 c g
 Diacyclops antrincola Kiefer, 1967 c g
 Diacyclops arenosus (Mazepova, 1950) c g
 Diacyclops badeniae Kiefer, 1958 c g
 Diacyclops balearicus Lescher-Moutoué, 1978 c g
 Diacyclops belgicus Kiefer, 1936 g
 Diacyclops bernardi (Petkovski, 1986) i c g
 Diacyclops biceri Boxshall, Evstigneeva & Clark, 1993 c g
 Diacyclops bicuspidatus (Claus, 1857) i c g
 Diacyclops bisetosus (Rehberg, 1880) i c g
 Diacyclops brevifurcus Ishida, 2006 c g
 Diacyclops chakan Fiers and Reid in Fiers et al., 1996 i c g
 Diacyclops charon (Kiefer, 1931) c g
 Diacyclops chrisae J. W. Reid, 1992 i c g
 Diacyclops clandestinus (Yeatman, 1964) c g
 Diacyclops cohabitatus Monchenko, 1980 c g
 Diacyclops cohabitus Monchenko, 1980 g
 Diacyclops conversus Reid, 2004 c g
 Diacyclops crassicaudis (G. O. Sars, 1863) i c g
 Diacyclops crassicaudoides (Kiefer, 1928) c g
 Diacyclops cristinae Pesce & Galassi, 1987 c g
 Diacyclops cryonastes Morton, 1985 c g
 Diacyclops danielopoli Pospisil & Stoch, 1999 c g
 Diacyclops dimorphus J. W. Reid and Strayer, 1994 i c g
 Diacyclops disjunctus Thallwitz, 1927 c g
 Diacyclops dispinosus Ishida, 1994 c g
 Diacyclops ecabensis Fiers, Ghenne & Suárez-Morales, 2000 c g
 Diacyclops einslei De Laurentiis, Pesce & Humphreys, 1999 c g
 Diacyclops ekmani (Lindberg, 1950) c g
 Diacyclops elegans (Mazepova, 1962) c g
 Diacyclops eriophori Gurney, 1927 c g
 Diacyclops eulitoralis Alekseev & Arov, 1986 c g
 Diacyclops felix Pospisil & Stoch, 1999 c g
 Diacyclops fontinalis Naidenov, 1969 c g
 Diacyclops galbinus (Mazepova, 1962) c g
 Diacyclops gauthieri Green, 1962 c g
 Diacyclops goticus (Kiefer, 1931) g
 Diacyclops hanguk Karanovic, Grygier & Lee, 2013 c g
 Diacyclops harryi J. W. Reid, 1992 i c g
 Diacyclops haueri (Kiefer, 1931) i c g
 Diacyclops hispidus Reid, 1988 c g
 Diacyclops hisuta Karanovic, Grygier & Lee, 2013 c g
 Diacyclops humphreysi Pesce & De Laurentiis, 1996 c g
 Diacyclops hypnicola (Gurney, 1927) i c g
 Diacyclops hypogeus Kiefer, 1930 c g
 Diacyclops ichnusae Pesce & Galassi, 1986 c g
 Diacyclops ichnusoides Petkovski & Karanovic, 1997 c g
 Diacyclops imparilis Monchenko, 1985 c g
 Diacyclops improcerus (Mazepova, 1950) c g
 Diacyclops incolotaenia (Mazepova, 1950) c g
 Diacyclops indianensis Reid, 2004 c g
 Diacyclops insularis Monchenko, 1982 c g
 Diacyclops intermedius (Mazepova, 1952) c g
 Diacyclops iranicus Pesce & Maggi, 1982 c g
 Diacyclops ishidai Karanovic, Grygier & Lee, 2013 c g
 Diacyclops italianus (Kiefer, 1931) g
 Diacyclops jasnitskii (Mazepova, 1950) c g
 Diacyclops jeanneli (Chappuis, 1929) i c g
 Diacyclops joycei Karanovic, Gibson, Hawes, Andersen & Stevens, 2014 c g
 Diacyclops jurenei Parveen, Mahoon & Saleem, 1988 c g
 Diacyclops karamani (Kiefer, 1932) c g
 Diacyclops kaupi Karanovic, Gibson, Hawes, Andersen & Stevens, 2014 c g
 Diacyclops konstantini (Mazepova, 1962) c g
 Diacyclops kyotensis ItoTak, 1964 c g
 Diacyclops landei (Mahoon & Zia, 1985) c g
 Diacyclops languidoides (Lilljeborg, 1901) i
 Diacyclops languidulus (Willey, 1925) c g
 Diacyclops languidus (G. O. Sars, 1863) i
 Diacyclops leeae Karanovic, Grygier & Lee, 2013 c g
 Diacyclops lewisi Reid, 2004 c g
 Diacyclops limnobius Kiefer, 1978 c g
 Diacyclops lindae Pesce, 1984 c g
 Diacyclops longifurcus (Shen & Sung, 1963) c g
 Diacyclops maggii Pesce & Galassi, 1987 c g
 Diacyclops michaelseni (Mrazek, 1901) c g
 Diacyclops mirnyi (Borutsky & Vinogradov, 1957) c g
 Diacyclops nagatoensis ItoTak, 1964 c g
 Diacyclops nanus (G. O. Sars, 1863) i
 Diacyclops navus (Herrick, 1882) i c g
 Diacyclops nearcticus (Kiefer, 1934) i c g
 Diacyclops neglectus Flössner, 1984 c g
 Diacyclops nikolasarburni Suárez-Morales, Mercado-Salas & Barlow, 2013 c g
 Diacyclops nuragicus Pesce & Galassi, 1986 c g
 Diacyclops odessanus (Shmankevich, 1875) c g
 Diacyclops palustris J. W. Reid, 1988 i c g
 Diacyclops paolae Pesce & Galassi, 1987 c g
 Diacyclops parahanguk Karanovic, Grygier & Lee, 2013 c g
 Diacyclops paralanguidoides Pesce & Galassi, 1987 c g
 Diacyclops parasuoensis Karanovic, Grygier & Lee, 2013 c g
 Diacyclops pelagonicus Petkovski, 1971 c g
 Diacyclops pilosus Fiers, Ghenne & Suárez-Morales, 2000 c g
 Diacyclops pseudosuoensis Karanovic, Grygier & Lee, 2013 c g
 Diacyclops puuc Fiers in Fiers et al., 1996 i c g
 Diacyclops reidae De Laurentiis, Pesce & Humphreys, 1999 c g
 Diacyclops ruffoi Kiefer, 1981 g
 Diacyclops salisae Reid, 2004 c g
 Diacyclops sardous Pesce & Galassi, 1987 c g
 Diacyclops scanloni Karanovic, 2006 c g
 Diacyclops skopljensis (Kiefer, 1932) c g
 Diacyclops slovenicus Petkovski, 1954 c g
 Diacyclops sobeprolatus Karanovic, 2006 c g
 Diacyclops sororum J. W. Reid, 1992 i c g
 Diacyclops spongicola (Mazepova, 1962) c g
 Diacyclops suoensis ItoTak, 1954 c g
 Diacyclops talievi (Mazepova, 1970) c g
 Diacyclops tantalus Kiefer, 1937 c g
 Diacyclops tenuispinalis Shen & Sung, 1963 c g
 Diacyclops thomasi (S. A. Forbes, 1882) i c g b
 Diacyclops trajani Reid & Strayer, 1994 c g
 Diacyclops uruguayensis (Kiefer, 1935) c g
 Diacyclops versutus (Mazepova, 1961) c g
 Diacyclops virginianus Reid, 1993 c g
 Diacyclops walkeri Karanovic, Gibson, Hawes, Andersen & Stevens, 2014 c g
 Diacyclops yeatmani J. W. Reid, 1988 i c g
 Diacyclops zhimulevi Sheveleva, Timoshkin, Aleksandrov & Tereza, 2010 c g
 Diacyclops zschokkei (Graeter, 1910) c g

Data sources: i = ITIS, c = Catalogue of Life, g = GBIF, b = Bugguide.net

References

Diacyclops
Articles created by Qbugbot